The Circuit de Lohéac is a racing circuit in Lohéac, Ille-et-Vilaine.

The circuit is the oldest Rallycross circuit in France. Since 1976, it has a round of the French Rallycross Championship annually. The circuit also hosts the French round of the FIA World Rallycross Championship since the inauguration of the championship in 2014.

History

This circuit was created by Michel Hommell, leader and founder of the Michel Hommell Group specializing in automotive magazines and between 1990 and 2003, would act as a car manufacturer. It is on this circuit that the inaugural French Rallycross Championship was raced, with the race taking place on September 5, 1976.

With over 80,000 spectators attending the 2018 edition, the French round of World Rallycross became the third most viewed auto racing event in France, after 24 Hours of Le Mans and French Grand Prix.

See also
 Rallycross
 FIA World Rallycross Championship
 FIA European Rallycross Championship
 Hommell
 Lohéac

References 

Motorsport venues in France
World Rallycross circuits